The Rauris Literature Prize is an annual Austrian literary award since 1972 by the Salzburg state government. The prize money is €10,000. It is awarded "for the best prose first publication by a German-speaking author from the previous year". The prize is presented at the opening of the Rauris Literature Days.

Recipients

 1972 Bodo Hell pp
 1973 Gerhard Amanshauser and Peter Rosei
 1974 Karin Struck
 1975 Franz Innerhofer
 1976 Peter Henisch (Special prize, no debut)
 1977 Hans Joachim Schädlich
 1978 Claudia Storz
 1979 Werner Herzog
 1980 Klaus Hoffer
 1981 not awarded
 1982 Thomas Hürlimann
 1983 Michael Köhlmeier and Martin R. Dean
 1984 Erwin Einzinger and Alain Claude Sulzer
 1985 Herta Müller and Helen Meier
 1986 Christa Moog and Eva Schmidt
 1987 Gisela Corleis
 1988 Werner Fritsch
 1989 Norbert Gstrein
 1990 Thomas Hettche
 1991 Judith Kuckart
 1992 Patrick Roth and Sabine Scholl
 1993 Ruth Klüger
 1994 Thomas Lehr
 1995 Klaus Händl
 1996 Raoul Schrott
 1997 Felicitas Hoppe and Katrin Seebacher
 1998 Bettina Galvagni
 1999 Peter Stamm
 2000 Gerhard Kelling
 2001 Corinna Soria
 2002 Juli Zeh
 2003 Katharina Faber
 2004 Katja Oskamp
 2005 Christine Pitzke
 2006 Kristof Magnusson
 2007 Steffen Popp
 2008 Simona Ryser
 2009 Julya Rabinowich
 2010 Thomas Klupp
 2011 Dorothee Elmiger
 2012 Maja Haderlap
 2013 Matthias Senkel
 2014 Saskia Hennig von Lange
 2015 Karen Köhler
 2016 Hanna Sukare
 2017 Senthuran Varatharajah
 2018 Raphaela Edelbauer
 2019 Philipp Weiss
 2020 Angela Lehner
 2021 
 2022

References

External links
 

Austrian literary awards
Awards established in 1972
Salzburg (state)